is the debut single by Japanese idol group STU48, released on January 31, 2018. Yumiko Takino served as lead performer for the title song. It topped the Japanese music charts in its release week.

Production and release 

The music video for the title song, filmed on the islands of Omishima and Hakatajima in Ehime Prefecture, was released on December 25, 2017.  The music video for "Setouchi no Koe", the group's first original song, was filmed at various locations in seven Setouchi region prefectures and was released earlier on June 5, and is the only STU48 music video featuring founding member Rino Sashihara, who left the group in November 2017.

The title song has different dance routines for the music video and live performances, with the music video choreographed by Hiroshima-based Flex Dance Agency and live performances by Cre8boy. "Setouchi no Koe" was also choreographed by Flex Dance Agency.

The single was released in eight editions, fifteen including Limited Editions. The B-side of each edition features a different version of the song "STU48" representing one of seven Setouchi region prefectures and its local dialect, plus one "Setouchi version" in the Theater edition. "Setouchi no Koe" was included in all editions and has previously been included in the AKB48 single "Negaigoto no Mochigusare", released on May 31, 2017.

Reception 
"Kurayami" sold around 152,000 copies in its release week according to Billboard Japan, and placed first in both the Oricon Singles and Billboard Japan Hot 100 charts. It won the Shikoku Block Award at the 2019 CD Shop Awards.

References

External links 
  

2019 singles
2019 songs
Songs with lyrics by Yasushi Akimoto
King Records (Japan) singles
Oricon Weekly number-one singles
Billboard Japan Hot 100 number-one singles